Dongri Buzurg railway station serves Dongri and surrounding villages in Bhandara district in Maharashtra, India.

References

Railway stations in Bhandara district
Nagpur SEC railway division